The 5th Hum Awards ceremony, presented by Pel, powered by QMobile and brought by Kashmir Cooking Oil & Banaspati, took place in Lahore on 29 April 2017 at 7:30pm PST. The ceremony was televised in Hum TV on 22 July 2017. During the ceremony, Hum Awards were presented in 25 categories.

The show was hosted by Hareem Farooq, Mikaal Zulfiqar, and Nadia Khan, while comedy hosting was done by Yasir Hussain and Ahmad Ali Butt.

Winners and nominees 
The public voting was announced in seven Viewers Choice Award Categories on 8 April 2017 until 18 April 2017.

Winners are listed first, highlighted in boldface.

Dramas with multiple nominations and awards 

The following eleven dramas received multiple nominations:

The following seven dramas received multiple awards:

Controversy 
The actor, Yasir Hussain, who co-hosted the show, was alleged for his inappropriate joke on child molestation when granting the award of Best Negative Role to Ahsan Khan.

References

External links
Official websites
 Hum Awards official website
 Hum Awards at Hum Network Limited 
 Hum Television Network and Entertainment Channel (HTNEC)
  (run by the Hum Television Network and Entertainment Channel)

2016 film awards
2016 television awards
2016 music awards
Hum Awards
Hum Awards ceremonies